Annadale Grammar School for Boys was an all-boys school located on the Annadale Embankment skirting the River Lagan in south Belfast, Northern Ireland.  In 1990, Annadale Grammar School (all boys) amalgamated with Carolan Grammar School (all girls) and became known as Wellington College Belfast.

Name
The name "Annadale" originated from Anne Hill, mother of Arthur Wellesley, 1st Duke of Wellington.  Wellington's grandfather, Arthur Hill, 1st Viscount Dungannon, lived at Belvoir Estate near Knockbreda and married Anne Stafford in 1737.  They bore 3 children, a boy and 2 girls.  Their eldest daughter, Anne, married Garret Wellesley, 1st Earl of Mornington and herself bore 2 sons and a daughter – Penelope Prudence, Richard and Arthur, Duke of Wellington.  The site on which the school was built was originally known as Anna's Dale, a name referred to in letters from the Duke to his mother which are now held by the school.  The school also possesses an oil painting of the area as it was at the time of Wellington and reputedly shows the famous Molly Ward's Tavern; an important meeting place during the time of the United Irishmen.

Badge
Annadale Grammar School colours were red, black and white.  The school badge, worn on the breast pocket of the black school blazer, was the "cockatrice" which is associated with the Duke of Wellington's coats of arms.  Until its amalgamation in 2006 the cockatrice provided the Regimental capbadge of the Duke of Wellington's Regiment.  It remains on the capbadge of the contemporary Yorkshire Regiment.

The school motto was "Virtus Fortunae Comes" meaning "Fortune Favours the Brave" – Wellington's motto.

The school song was "De Brevitate Vitae (On the Shortness of Life)", perhaps more commonly known by its first words "Gaudeamus Igitur (Let Us Therefore Rejoice)".  This is a very old and popular academic song in many European countries.

The four school houses were named after World War II Irish generals: Alexander; Alanbrooke; Dill; Montgomery.

External links
Wellington College Belfast website

Grammar schools in Belfast
Educational institutions disestablished in 1990
Boys' schools in Northern Ireland
Wellington College Belfast